The Gustav Meese Building is a historic building in West Central, Spokane, Washington. It was built in 1905 for the Gustav Meese Washington Broom Factory, to replace a previous building destroyed in a fire. Meese was a businessman from San Francisco; he owned the building until his death in 1934. It has been listed on the National Register of Historic Places since February 16, 1996.

It was deemed "significant due to its architectural stature as an industrial property type of good integrity representing the West Central neighborhood, its association with commercial development in the area, and its connection to persons important to the commercial development of Spokane. The Washington Broom Factory is the oldest industrial building in the area and retains a higher level of integrity than most nearby buildings of historic vintage."

References

National Register of Historic Places in Spokane County, Washington
Buildings and structures completed in 1904